Steven C. Englebright (born August 24, 1946) was the Assembly member for the 4th District of the New York Assembly until his defeat in 2022.  He is a Democrat. 

Englebright was first elected to the New York State Assembly in 1992. He was the chair of the Assembly Committee on Environmental Conservation.

Englebright graduated from Bayside High School in Queens, New York. He received a B.S. degree from the University of Tennessee in 1969 and an M.S. in Paleontology/Sedimentology from Stony Brook University in 1974.

He worked as Curator of Geologic Collections at Stony Brook University and was the founding director of the Museum of Long Island Natural Sciences. Englebright served as a Suffolk County legislator from 1983 until his election to the New York State Assembly in 1992.

Englebright was defeated in the 2022 election by Edward Flood.

References

External links
  – New York State Assembly, 4th District: Steve Englebright

1946 births
Living people
Democratic Party members of the New York State Assembly
Stony Brook University alumni
University of Tennessee alumni
People from Setauket, New York
21st-century American politicians
Bayside High School (Queens) alumni